Canutulachama (or Canutulahina) is a legendary fourth century Pictish monarch known only from regnal lists.

References

Pictish monarchs
4th-century Scottish monarchs